Yerida ( yerida, "descent") is emigration by Jews from the State of Israel (or in religious texts, Land of Israel). Yerida is the opposite of aliyah (lit. "ascent"), which is immigration by Jews to Israel. Zionists are generally critical of the act of yerida and the term is somewhat derogatory. The emigration of non-Jewish Israelis is not included in the term.

Common reasons for emigration given are the high cost of living, a desire to escape from the ongoing Arab–Israeli conflict, academic or professional ambitions, and disillusion with Israeli society.

Etymology
Emigrants from Israel are known as yordim ("those who go down [from Israel]"). Immigrants to Israel are known as olim ("those who go up [to Israel]"). The use of the Hebrew word "Yored" (which means "descending") is a modern renewal of a term taken from the Torah: "" ("I myself will go down with you to Egypt, and I will also bring you up again" Genesis 46:4), 
"" ("Now there was a famine in the land, and Abram went down to Egypt to live there because the famine was severe." Genesis 12:10), 
and from the Mishnah: "", 
and from the Talmud "" (The Land of Israel is higher than all the [other] lands).

In the Bible, the first yored was Abraham, followed later by Joseph and Jacob, who "went down" to Egypt in the book of Genesis.  Rabbinical scholars later interpreted this principle as yerida letsorech aliyah which translates to "to sink in order to rise" (a concept similar to the contemporary expression of hitting "rock bottom").

Jewish law
Jewish Law or Halakha defines certain restrictions on emigration from Israel. According to Moses Maimonides, it is only permitted to emigrate and resettle abroad in cases of severe hunger. Joseph Trani determined that it is permissible to emigrate from Israel for marriage, to study Torah or to support oneself, including in cases where famine is not present. In any case, emigration from Israel and even temporary departure is not thought of in Orthodox or traditional Judaism as a worthy act for a man.

History
It is difficult to estimate the number of people who emigrated from Ottoman and Mandate Palestine between the start of the Zionist movement and the establishment of the State of Israel, or the proportion of emigrants compared with the number of immigrants into the country. Estimates of the extent of emigration during the period of the initial Zionist settlement in Palestine with the First Aliyah, as well as the Second Aliyah, range between approximately 40% (an estimation made by Joshua Kaniel) of all immigrants and up to 80–90%. Although the precise number is unknown, it is known that many of the European Jewish immigrants during this period gave up after a few months and left, often suffering from hunger and disease. In the latter part of the Fourth Aliyah, during 1926–1928, the mandatory authorities recorded 17,972 Jewish immigrants, and the Jewish Agency counted about 1,100 more who were not registered with the authorities. During the same period, the authorities recorded 14,607 Jewish emigrants. Overall, it is estimated that about 60,000 Jews emigrated from Mandatory Palestine between 1923 and 1948, and that the total number of Jews who emigrated from the start of the Zionist project to the establishment of the state was around 90,000.

After Israel was established in 1948, the country experienced a wave of mass immigration lasting from 1948 to 1951, primarily from post-Holocaust Europe and Arab and Muslim countries, absorbing 688,000 immigrants during this period. However, some 10% of these immigrants would leave the country in the following years, primarily to Canada, Australia, and South America. A small number went to the United States, and it was thought that the US would be the primary destination had immigration restrictions set out by the Immigration Act of 1924 not still been in place. By 1953, the wave of immigration had leveled off, and emigration was increasing. Initially, emigration from Israel was composed largely of immigrants who were unsatisfied with life there, but in the mid-1970s, number of native Israelis leaving the country grew.

From 1948 until 1961, Israeli citizens required an exit visa as well as a passport to travel overseas even temporarily. Initially the intention was to prevent the departure of Jews who ought to be fighting, but also due to a perception that those leaving harmed national solidarity. After the six day war the restrictions were eased somewhat but still many administrative hurdles were put in front of those wishing to leave. To prevent the outflow of foreign currency, tickets could only be purchased with money sent from abroad. The general need for an exit visa was finally abolished in 1961 after several court cases and Knesset decisions.

In 1980 deputy Prime Minister Simha Erlich and the Director of the Jewish Agency Shmuel Lahis studied emigration to the United States. The Lahis Report estimated that there were 300,000 to 500,000 Israelis living in the United States, mainly in New York and Los Angeles. In 1982, Dov Shilansky, a Deputy Minister who was tasked with heading efforts to prevent Yerida, noted that some 300,000 Israelis had emigrated since 1948, and attributed a housing shortage and high unemployment as the primary reasons for Israeli emigration at the time.

Yerida skyrocketed in the mid-1980s, due to a combination of the effects of the 1982 Lebanon War, exposure of Israeli tourists to other cultures and new opportunities in other Western countries, and an economic crisis brought on by the 1983 Israel bank stock crisis. In 1984 and 1985, more Jews emigrated from than immigrated to Israel. At the time, the Israeli government became alarmed over the large amount of emigration, and politicians and government entities often cited statistics claiming that hundreds of thousands of Israelis were living abroad. However, these statistics may not have been accurate; around this time, Pini Herman, a demographer, interviewed an Israeli government statistician in charge of compiling data on yordim. According to Herman, the data showed that since 1948, fewer than 400,000 Israelis had moved abroad and never returned. When he asked him how other government entities regularly claimed much higher figures, the statistician said that his bureau was never actually consulted.

In November 2003, the Ministry of Immigration and Absorption estimated that 750,000 Israelis were living abroad, primarily in the United States and Canada—about 12.5 percent of the Jewish population of Israel.
In April 2008, the Ministry of Immigration and Absorption estimated that 700,000 Israelis were living abroad, of those, 450,000 were living in the U.S. and Canada, and 50,000-70,000 in Britain.

In 2012, a new Global Religion and Migration Database constructed by the Pew Research Center showed that there were a total of 330,000 native-born Israelis, including 230,000 Jews, living abroad, approximately 4% of Israel's native-born Jewish population. Immigrants to Israel who later left were not counted. Danny Gadot of the Israeli consulate in Los Angeles claimed that although some 600,000-750,000 Israelis were estimated to be living in the United States, many were not native-born and were in fact the children of Israeli expatriates, as the children of Israelis born abroad are counted as Israeli citizens. That year, it was reported that yerida had hit a 40-year low, while the number of Israelis returning from abroad had increased.

Demography

 Between 1948 and 1958, over 100,000 Jews emigrated from Israel. 
 Israel's net international migration balance and the total immigration between 1948 and 1994 was 80 per cent, pointing to a missing share, i.e., a ratio of immigrants to emigrants, of 20 percent. Historically, Israel's long term migration retention ratio of 80 per cent is much higher than other countries' receiving large masses of immigration such as the United States, Argentina, Brazil, Australia and New Zealand. Sergio DellaPergola attributes Israel's comparatively high migration retention to two related factors. The family transfer character of Aliyah, that is the relocation of entire households, including women, children and elderly members, implies abandonment of the place of origin. The second factor was the impossibility of return to countries where perceived discrimination or actual persecutions were among the main motivating factors for leaving.
 According to the Israeli Central Bureau of Statistics, a little over 500,000 Israelis emigrated between 1990 and 2014, of whom about 230,000 eventually returned to Israel.
 In 2012 the total estimated Israeli-born Jewish international migrants originating in Israel was 230,000 from the Pew Research Center Global Religion and Migration Database.
Over 100,000 Israeli citizens are believed to be living in Russia. Many Israeli cultural events are hosted for the Russian-Israeli community in Russia, and many live part of the year in Israel. (To cater to the Israeli community in Russia, Israeli cultural centres are located in Moscow, Saint Petersburg, Novosibirsk and Yekaterinburg.)
 All evidence points to the U.S. being the primary destination of Israeli emigrants. In 1982, demographer Pini Herman estimated that there were 100,000 Israeli emigrants residing in the U.S., half of whom lived in the New York and New Jersey metropolitan area with another 10,000–12,000 living in the Los Angeles area. The relative stability of the New York component of this Israeli immigrant population was confirmed nearly three decades later in a 2009 study for the UJA Federation of New York by Steven M. Cohen and Judith Veinstein, which found that New York has 41,000 Israelis immigrants.
 Cohen and Haberfield estimated that in 1990 there were 110,000 to 130,000 Israeli immigrants residing in the U.S.
 Statistics from the United States Department of Homeland Security show that between 1949 and 2015, about 250,000 Israelis gained permanent residency in the United States, although they did not track those who later returned to Israel.
 The 1990 U.S decennial census indicates that 94,718 Israel/Palestine-born persons lived in the United States. The 2000 U.S decennial census indicates that the number of Israel/Palestine-born U.S. persons rose to 125,325.
 The 1990 National Jewish Population Survey estimate of Israelis in the U.S. is based on the definition of "Israelis" as Jews who were born in Israel and estimates a total of 63,000 Israeli-born adult Jews living in the United States. In addition, a total of 30,000 children live in the households of Israel-born adult Jews. Maximally, then, the Israeli-born Jewish population in the U.S. in 1990 was 93,000. However, only 7,000 of the children were reported born before the Israeli-born adult emigrated to the United States, suggesting the Israeli-born Jewish population residing in the United States is 70,000, with 23,000 children born to Israeli immigrants already living in the U.S. and thus technically first generation Americans.
 The 2010 U.S. Census found an increase of 30 percent of persons born in Israel, some 140,323 persons born in Israel, up from 109,720 in 2000. About two-thirds of U.S. Israeli-borns held U.S. citizenship, 90,179 had U.S. citizenship in 2010 and 50,144 did not.
 The number of American Jews who immigrated to Israel and gained Israeli citizenship, lived there for a certain period of time, and then returned to the United States is more difficult to estimate, ranging 30,000 and 60,000 by 1990, and between 53,000 and 75,000 by 2000. In total during that year, the number of Israeli Jews (those who were born in Israel and those who only lived there for a certain period of time) who lived in the United States stood between 153,000 and 175,000.
 Assuming that the United States is the most significant destination of immigration for Israelis, the sociologist Yinon Cohen estimated that in 2000 the total number of the Israeli Jews who live outside Israel was between 300,000 and 350,000.
 The Israel Central Bureau of Statistics classifies "Israelis who left the country" as Israelis who lived outside Israel for more than one year continuously, but who prior to that year lived in Israel for at least 90 days continuously, thus distinguishing between those who left the state and those who left in the past and returned for a short visit. In the 1950s and 1960s, indeed until the early 1970s, the Statistical Abstract published by the Israel Central Bureau of Statistics did list emigration figures. Subsequently, the practice was suspended, this avoided conflict with other Israeli government entities who cited much larger numbers of emigrants than the Israel Central Bureau of Statistics published estimates. Emigration estimates can still be inferred from current population projections by the CBS: Between the years 1990 to 2005 emigration assumptions from Israel by the CBS averaged 14,000 people per year. 1993, 1995 and 2001–2002 saw relatively high levels of emigration. The rate of the emigrants from Israel decreased during those years from 3 per thousand to 1 per thousand as a result of an increase in total Israeli population. This total estimate includes both the Israeli Arab emigrants and Israeli Jews who may have died while abroad. The CBS analyzed the border control data and computed a "gross balance" of 581,000 Israelis living abroad during the period 1948–1992. In other words, there were 581,000 more exits from Israel than re-entries on the part of Israeli residents (i.e., persons living in Israel whether native-born or born elsewhere). About half of the persons leaving Israel named the United States as their destination. Assuming that they stayed in the United States, and that no other Israelis came to the United States via other countries, the "gross balance" of Israelis residing in the United States would be 290,500. Zvi Eisenbach, working from Israeli data, has calculated that about 74 percent of American Israelis are Jews. Thus, the gross balance of Israeli Jews in the United States over the period 1948–1992 is adjusted down to 216,000. Gold and Phillips subtracted from this number 25,000 persons who would have died, leaving 265,500. Since the gross balance subtracts reentrances to Israel from exits out of Israel, Gold and Phillips subtracted 18,400 more persons who may be assumed to have returned to Israel in 1993 (the number that re-entered Israel in 1992), for an adjusted gross balance of 172,848 Jewish Israelis living in the United States.
 The Organisation for Economic Co-operation and Development calculated an 'expatriate rate' of 2.9 persons per thousand, putting Israel in the mid-range of expatriate rates among the 175 OECD countries examined in 2005.
 The Israel Central Bureau of Statistics created their most recent population projection to 2010 with the assumption that 6,600 Jewish Israelis per year will leave the country.
 Over a third of persons in the U.S. who define themselves as Israeli may be American born children of Israeli emigrants, many of whom have never lived in or even visited Israel, but are counted as Israeli citizens under Israeli law. The 2000 U.S. decennial Census had 107,000 persons who reported Israeli as their first or second ancestry, of these persons 51 percent reported country of birth as Israel/Palestine, 39 percent reported being born in the U.S., 3 percent were born in the former Soviet Union and Eastern Europe and the remaining 7 percent in other countries.
 The number of undocumented Israelis in the U.S. has been demonstrated to be relatively low during the IRCA legalizations in the early 1990s, when only 1.62 percent of Israeli foreign born (1,449 persons) applied for legalization as compared to 12.6 percent undocumented (2.5 million persons) of all foreign born in the U.S. applying for IRCA legalization.
 The 2006 Canadian quinquennial census counted 26,215 persons who reported Israeli citizenship, of whom two-thirds (67 percent) lived in the Ontario region.
 In 2009, a study by the University of British Columbia concluded that there were 45,000 Israelis living in Canada, while other estimates put the figure at 60,000. Of them, about 26,000 were found to live in the Vancouver Metropolitan Area. Overall, Israeli expatriates were estimated to make up 14% of Canadian Jewry.
 Between 40,000 and 60,000 Israelis have either emigrated to or established long-term residency in India, and live primarily in Goa and Maharashtra.
 The 2001 UK census recorded 11,892 Israelis living in the United Kingdom. Most of them live in London; particularly in the densely populated Jewish area of Golders Green. It has been estimated that there are up to 70,000 people of Israeli descent in the UK.
Moscow has the largest single Israeli citizen community in the world, with 80,000 Israeli citizens living in the city as of 2014, almost all of them native Russian-speakers. 
 About 7,000 Israelis live in Australia. They are heavily concentrated in Sydney and Melbourne.
 Between 8,000 and 15,000 Israeli expatriates live in Germany. Practically all of them reside in Berlin.
 Between 2005 and 2012, 116 Israelis were granted asylum in the United States after claiming that they were persecuted or faced "mortal danger" by remaining in Israel, out of a total of 405 requests. These cases were believed to consist of Israeli-Arabs, former Soviet immigrants, and radical Haredim.
 The Israeli Central Bureau of Statistics estimates that between the state's founding in 1948 and 2015, about 720,000 Israelis emigrated and never returned to live in Israel. In 2017, it estimated that between 557,000 and 593,000 Israelis, not including children born to Israeli emigrants, were living abroad.

Reasons for emigration phenomenon
The main motives for leaving Israel are usually connected with the emigrants' desire for improved living standards, or to search for work opportunities and professional advancement, for higher education. From the beginning of the 1980s, the emigration phenomenon in Israel gained momentum because of the social, financial, cultural, and political changes that occurred in the country. 

In Berlin for instance the main reasons for Israeli migration to the city were found to be the following: dissatisfactions with life in Israel, a realization of personal potential career and academic wise, following the relocation of a spouse / having a German spouse, and the relatively low cost of living in Berlin integrated with the cultural value and diversity the city has to offer. 

A study conducted by Omer Moav and Arik Gold, analyzing Israelis leaving the country from 1995-2005. They found a much higher rate in highly educated people who go instead of those with mandatory education. In light of the current situation, parents have come together to try and bring Israeli scientists home. They say there are not enough grants or conditions offered for those who emigrate from Israel, specifically the young. The other countries offer better opportunities with their research centers and funding, allowing that sufficient qualified income to support themselves financially while often going through school.

Polls amongst emigrants have shown that the political situation and security threats in Israel are not among the main factors in emigration. Emigration is also common amongst new immigrants who failed to successfully integrate into Israeli society especially if they were unable to master the Hebrew language,  failed to integrate into the labor market, or who already made one major residence change in their lives and therefore found an additional change easier to make. Some of the immigrants move to a third country, almost always in the West, and some of them return to the country of their origin, a phenomenon which increases when the conditions in the country of origin improve, as occurred in the former USSR in the first decade of the 21st century.

Since the founding of the State of Israel, polls have shown that those leaving the country were on average more educated than the ones who remained in Israel. This phenomenon is even more extreme amongst new immigrants who leave Israel than amongst native-born Israelis who leave Israel. Therefore, the emigration from Israel has occasionally been referred to as a Brain drain. An OECD estimate put the highly educated emigrant rate at 5.3 per thousand highly educated Israelis, actually placing Israel in the lower third compared to OECD countries where the overall average was 14 per thousand highly educated emigrants. Israel, with its well developed technical and educational infrastructure and larger base of highly educated citizens, is retaining a greater percentage of its highly educated persons than developed countries such as Belgium, the Netherlands, Finland, Denmark and New Zealand.

Circular migration
The migration of Israeli Jews was often thought to be unidirectional and described as yerida, but there is reason to believe that a significant pattern of return, hazara ( hazara, "return"), has been described as returning to Israel after relatively long periods, of at least a year or more, where homes and livelihoods have to be established or re-established. Most Israelis who emigrate do not leave permanently, and eventually return home after an extended period abroad.  This circular migration may be especially pronounced for highly skilled  and highly educated Israeli migrants and their families.

In 2007 a special program by the Immigrant Absorption Minister of Israel was announced, intended to encourage Israeli emigrants to return to Israel. It was further decided that by 2008 the Ministry would invest 19 million shekels to establish lucrative absorption plans for the returning emigrants. (see: Taxation in Israel). Until then, 4,000 Israeli expatriates returned each year. In 2008, these numbers began growing. Since the start of this campaign, the number of Israelis returning home has doubled. Return reached a peak of 11,000 in 2010. From 2010 to October 2012, a record 22,470 Israelis returned, including 4,837 academics and researchers, 2,720 technical professionals, and 681 business managers.

Israel has granted the legal status of Toshav Hozer ( toshav hozer, "returning resident") to Israeli citizens having resided abroad for at least two years (1.5 years for students); during his/her time abroad, has not visited Israel for 120 days or more per year (365 days); has not used his/her rights as a returning resident in the past.

According to demographer Pini Herman, this circular migration has been an economic boon to Israel. Israel does not have the technological, academic, and other infrastructural resources to absorb its disproportionate number of highly trained and skilled population, second only to the United States. As a result, many Israelis have worked overseas for extended periods of time. Upon their return, they have often attracted or repatriated with them to Israel new infrastructure, such as that provided by companies like as Intel, Google, Microsoft, and IBM.

Emigration and Zionist ideology
The rejection of emigration from Israel is a central assumption in all forms of Zionism as a corollary of the "Negation of the Diaspora" in Zionism which according to Eliezer Schweid was a central tenet of Israeli Zionist education until the 1970s when there was a need for Israel to reconcile itself with the Jewish diaspora and its massive support of Israel following the Six-Day War.

Many believe that the Yerida phenomenon is the failure of the Zionist movement, yet some believe that it is its success. When asked about it in an interview, the poet Irit Katz said that she thinks Israeli Jews are comfortably emigrating to other countries because Israel is finally "normal" and that they are finally "allowed" to do so without hurting their country.

Attitudes in Israeli society
 During the first immigration waves the emigration from Israel was a great cause for pessimism in regards to the success of the Zionist enterprise.
 In a 1976 interview, Israel's Prime Minister Yitzhak Rabin identified the Israeli emigrants as "fall-outs of weaklings" (נפולת של נמושות). Nowadays there is much less antagonism among Israelis regarding emigrants. The main problem for the Zionist leadership of the State of Israel in the past was the idea that people born in Israel could choose to emigrate, despite the fact that they did not face the same difficulties as new immigrants who decided to leave after failing to integrate.
In an interview in 2008 Ehud Barak, the Israeli defense minister and former prime minister said that "Jews know that they can land on their feet in any corner of the world. The real test for us is to make Israel such an attractive place—cutting edge in science, education, culture, quality of life—that even American Jewish young people want to come here. If we cannot do this, even those who were born here will consciously decide to go to other places. This is a real problem."
 Territorial Therapy, the ideation of migration or yerida, is often a psychological outlet or mechanism utilized by many Israelis to counter the stress of living in a dangerous political situation in the Middle East. A variety of polls over the years have shown that it is common for Israelis to actively and seriously consider that they or their children might leave Israel to live in other parts of the world, primarily the United States and Canada.
 Another way in which the ideation of migration is demonstrated is in the relatively high numbers of Israelis who seek citizenship of European Union countries, (where in 2007 an estimated 42 percent of Israelis are eligible for citizenship based on their parents' and grandparents' nationalities). More than 4,000 Israelis received German citizenship in 2007, a 50 percent increase over 2005. A recent survey by the Jerusalem-based Menachem Begin Heritage Center found that 59% of Israelis had approached or intended to approach a foreign embassy to ask for citizenship and a passport and North American countries, possibly to use as a safe haven, but actually continue living in Israel. The seeking, attainment and possession of multiple nationalities by a Jewish individual is allowed by Israeli law, whereas many other nations require a renouncement of foreign citizenship and the voluntary attainment of a foreign citizenship can result in the loss of citizenship in that country. For example, 220 Israeli diplomats to the U.S. have received 'Green card' or Permanent Resident Alien status between 1966 and 1979  but the likelihood is low that these career Israeli government officials permanently emigrated from Israel, but rather they gained a passport of convenience to travel to countries that may be less welcoming or even forbidden for travelers with Israeli passports.
 Some polls, such as the Gallup World Poll in 2007 revealed that significant numbers of Israelis, 20 percent, would ideally, if they had the opportunity, move permanently to another country. This was in the mid-range of desire to migrate and less than, for example, the residents of Denmark, Belgium, Mexico, Argentina, Italy, Poland, Hungary, South Korea and Chile. The 'push factor' bringing about migration is often reflected in quality of life perceptions. In terms of self ranked quality of life Israelis rate their own lives on a scale numbered from zero at the bottom to ten at the top, Israelis' average rating in 2007 was 6.84, which is far higher than the 4 average for the world and compares with Denmark's 8, among the world's top.
 Younger Israeli age groups, such as teens, express a much higher desire to live abroad than the general Israeli population. Almost half of Israeli teens aged 14–18 years old expressed a desire to live outside of Israel in 2007. 68 percent of teens believed that Israel's general situation is "not good."
Common Israeli attitudes toward migration to Israel and Jews living in the Diaspora may have shifted polarities in terms of Zionism. In 2009 Hebrew University sociologist Vered Vinitzky-Seroussi said the fact that it has become commonplace for Israelis to move abroad, either permanently or for a stint, makes it contradictory for their families to look down on Diaspora Jews. Haifa University sociologist Oz Almog said in a recent interview: "Ask Israelis now what they think about Jews coming from countries where they aren't persecuted, like the U.S. and Britain, to live in Israel, and they'll say, 'Those who do are nuts.'"

Emigration and Israeli politics
 The topic of Yerida is often brought up during political campaigns in Israel with various political parties and candidates arguing that one or another's policies will increase or lessen emigration from Israel. Occasionally a political party will have a 'yerida' plank in its election manifesto and winning sides have on occasion appointed persons holding the Yerida portfolio at the ministerial or vice ministerial rank. Various bills in the Israeli Knesset are often argued on the grounds that they will prevent or engender emigration.
 Popular protest movements, particularly after wars and around economic and ethnic equity issues have often been accompanied by their activists' threats of voting with their feet by emigrating from Israel, and at times the burning of Israeli identity cards by Israeli protesters threatening that their next move would be emigration if their demands weren't met has been featured in the Israeli media. On one occasion in the 1970s an Israeli Black Panther ethnic equity protester with a great fanfare and media coverage did emigrate to Morocco and remigrated to Israel after a period. 
 In 1998 Janet Aviad, a leader of the Israeli group Peace Now, noted, "As soon as our people hear Bibi [Prime Minister Benjamin Netanyahu], they turn off the radio. They have gone on 'inner yerida'."
 Avraham Burg, former Chairman of the Jewish Agency for Israel and former Speaker of the Knesset, questioned in 2007 the centrality of Israel in Jewish life and states his view that it is legitimate to live outside of Israel: "We were raised on the Zionism of Ben-Gurion, that there is only one place for Jews and that's Israel. I say no, there have always been multiple centers of Jewish life."
 In 2008 in the context of an ideological crisis in Israel caused by record-low and shrinking aliya figures, Israel's Immigration Absorption Ministry embarked on a new mission targeting Israeli emigrants, the 'Israeli' Diaspora, in addition to the Jewish diaspora under the title of "Returning Home on Israel's 60th." The question of whether the focus on bringing Israelis back to Israel is off target for a ministry that is meant to be working with immigrants once they arrive Israel has been raised. The Immigration Absorption Ministry spokesperson explained that no other government body is responsible for Israel's former residents and it is about time that someone tapped into these resources to help them.
 In 2009 a Knesset bill was introduced with Binyamin Natanyahu's support to enable Israelis residing abroad (estimated in the bill to be 800,000 to a million) be able to vote in Israel's next general elections. The bill did not pass.
 In 2014, following the Protective Edge Gaza War a song, "Berlin", dealing with emigration from Israel by the Israeli band Shmemel gained notice as a protest song whose lyrics and video content highlight the alternatives to living in Israel.

Reaction of Jewish diaspora communities
 Rabbi Joseph Telushkin notes the American Jewish community's ambivalent response to yordim continues to write: "generally secular yordim shun involvement in Jewish communal life, and maintain social ties only with each other."
 Rob Eshman notes that Israeli emigrants have been treated by local Jews "as something less than full members of the Tribe" and that this "cold shoulder" reception happened with the full blessing of the government of the State of Israel itself.
 Welcome of emigrants by diaspora Jewish community is seen as a possible betrayal of the Zionist ideal—immigration to Israel—and endangerment of Israel's success in retaining and growing its Jewish population. Israel encouraged organized Jewish Diaspora communities not to offer Israeli emigrant services as this might be perceived as a welcome or assistance which would encourage the Israeli emigrants to stay.
 Israeli emigrants buttress the local Jewish diaspora community
 Israeli emigrants are perceived as an economic bellwether during the 2009 recession; the return to Israel of perceived large numbers of Israeli emigrants was given attention in the American Jewish Media.
Local ambivalence and controversy in a New Jersey Jewish community caused by yerida:
People in the community seem to take pride in Teaneck's high rate of Aliyah to Israel. It's certainly something to be proud of. But we make no mention of the equally high rates (maybe even higher rates) of "yerida" from Israel to Teaneck. My feeling is these 'yordim' should not be accorded honors in our synagogues or schools. These people are the antithesis of what we want to teach our children, of how we want to live. For most religious Zionists, of which Teaneck has more than a few, the goal is to end up in Israel. Having "yordim" as community leaders here is bad public policy. Recently, one of the largest synagogues in town installed a "yored" as its president. Our schools honor "yordim" on a regular basis at their dinners. "Yordim" make up a large percentage of our school's Hebrew teachers.
 Perception of Israeli emigrants by diaspora community organizations
 Low rates of Israeli emigrant participation in Jewish organizations
 Low rates of financial support of local Jewish organizations and synagogues
 Israeli emigrants working in low status immigrant occupations that the diaspora Jewish population tends not to engage in or has long-ago abandoned such as taxi driving, auto repair, security guards, mall cart sales and other tasks. Israeli Prime Minister Golda Meir told of a waiter who once came over to her at a New York luncheon and whispered in Hebrew that there was ham in the dish she had been served. When she asked him how he knew Hebrew, he told her he was an Israeli. And what work had he done in Israel, she asked. He had been a waiter, he responded.

Israeli emigrants in the Diaspora

United States

 In 2009 Steven M. Cohen and Judith Veinstein found that in New York, Jewish Israeli emigrants are highly affiliated with the Jewish community even though community affiliation is low in Israel. Israelis were found to be more connected to Judaism than their American counterparts in terms of synagogue membership and attendance, kashrut observance, participation in Jewish charity events and membership in Jewish community centers, among other indicators used by the study.
 In 1982, Pini Herman and David LaFontaine, in a study of Israeli emigrants in Los Angeles, found high levels of Jewish affiliation, Jewish organizational participation and concentration in Jewish neighborhoods by Israeli emigrants. Israeli emigrants who behaved in a comparatively secular manner in Israel tended to behave in a more devoutly Jewish manner in Los Angeles and Israeli emigrants who reported greater Jewish behaviors in Israel tended to engage in Jewish behaviors to a lesser degree in Los Angeles, thus both becoming more 'Americanized' in their Jewish behaviors.

Israelis tend to be disproportionately Jewishly active in their diaspora communities, creating and participating formal and informal organizations, participating in diaspora Jewish religious institutions and sending their children to Jewish education providers at a greater rate than local diaspora Jews.

In Los Angeles a Council of Israeli Community was founded in 2001. In Los Angeles an Israel Leadership Club was organized and has been active in support activities for Israel, most recently in 2008, it sponsored with the local Jewish Federation and Israeli consulate a concert in support for the embattled population suffering rocket attacks of Sderot, Israel where the three frontrunners for the U.S. president, Hillary Clinton, Barack Obama, John McCain greeted the attendees by video and expressed their support for the residents of Sderot. An Israeli Business Network of Beverly Hills has existed since 1996. The Israeli-American Study Initiative (IASI), a start-up project based at the UCLA International Institute, is set out to document the lives and times of Israeli Americans—initially focusing on those in Los Angeles and eventually throughout the United States.

A variety of Hebrew language websites, newspapers and magazines are published in South Florida, New York, Los Angeles and other U.S. regions. The Israeli Channel along with two other Hebrew-language channels are available via satellite broadcast nationally in the United States. Hebrew language Israeli programming on local television was broadcast in New York and Los Angeles during the 1990s, prior to Hebrew language satellite broadcast. Live performances by Israeli artists are a regular occurrence in centers of Israeli emigrants in the U.S. and Canada with audience attendance often in the hundreds. An Israeli Independence Day Festival has taken place yearly in Los Angeles since 1990 with thousands of Israeli emigrants and American Jews.

In popular culture
 Comedian-writer Robert Smigel came up with a Saturday Night Live sketch in 1990 called the "Sabra Shopping Network". Two years later, Smigel followed it up with "Sabra Price Is Right", starring Tom Hanks as a pushy Israeli game show host, Sandler and Rob Schneider as its presenters and Smigel as a cigarette-smoking announcer, all pushing shoddy electronics on hapless clientele.
 The concept for the 2008 You Don't Mess with the Zohan movie, which was based on the skits "Sabra Shopping Network" and "Sabra Price Is Right", focused on Zohan Dvir, an IDF commando soldier, who stages his own death to fulfill his deepest dream—moving to New York to become a hairdresser.
 At the end of the 2005 film Munich, the main character Avner (played by Eric Bana), who is an Israeli Mossad agent, decides to move from Israel to Brooklyn, New York, to reunite with his wife and their child.

Russia
Moscow has the largest single Israeli expatriate community in the world, with 80,000 Israeli citizenship holders living in the city as of 2014, almost all of them native Russian-speakers holding dual citizenship. Many Israeli cultural events are hosted for the community, and many live part of the year in Israel. (To cater to the Israeli community, Israeli cultural centres are located in Moscow, Saint Petersburg, Novosibirsk and Yekaterinburg.) There are 60 flights a week between Tel Aviv and Moscow.

United Kingdom

Canada

Germany

Both the Jewish and Israeli community in Germany are growing. Named Olim L'Berlin (progress towards Berlin) 2014 a Facebook website coined a snowclone and the so-called 'pudding or milky protest' in Israel, as the prices for comparable household items in Germany are rather low in comparison. Israeli Band Shmemels' song parodying Jerusalem of Gold with the notion, 'Jacob went down to Egypt, because the rent was a third and salaries double - Reichstag of Peace, Euro and Light' grew as well famous in the context. According to Haaretz, the conflict is less about pudding prices but about the now shattered taboo of Yerida, emigrating from Israel.

The fact that Germany was chosen as the destination struck a raw nerve across the social and political spectrum, considering Israel's founding in 1948 in the wake of the Holocaust, its large population of Holocaust survivors, and the many citizens who still refuse to buy products made in Germany. Agriculture Minister Yair Shamir stated, "I pity the Israelis who no longer remember the Holocaust and abandoned Israel for a pudding".

Australia

Romania
After the fall of Communism, many Israeli Jews moved to Romania, most of them as businesspeople. As of 2017, there were 3,000 Israeli-born people living in Romania. In addition, every year tens of Romanian Jews in Israel and their descendants immigrate to their country of origin.

Italy

Israelis frequently visit Italy for education, work, tourism, and scientific and artistic exchanges. In the last ten years 105 books of Italian authors were translated from Italian to Hebrew. A strong community of Italqim who have made aliyah to Israel have strengthened cultural ties and promoted Italian culture in the country.  The Italian Cultural Institute recently initiated and organized a series of activities in the Cultural Center of the Jews of Libyan extraction in Or Yehuda, where recently a course of the Italian language has been launched.

The two Countries signed a Cultural Agreement in Rome on 11 November 1971.

India

There is a fairly small community of young Israelis in India who come to the country after completing their army services. There are others who stay for religious reasons to help their brethren living there.

See also

 American Jews
 Russian Jews
 Brain drain
 Galut
 The "Negation of the Diaspora" in Zionism
 Jewish assimilation
 Immigration to the United States
 Yom HaAliyah

References

Aliyah
Demographics of Israel